Command performance  may refer to:

Command Performance (1931 film), starring Neil Hamilton and Una Merkel
Command Performance (1937 film), starring Arthur Tracy and Lilli Palmer
Command Performance (2009 film), starring Dolph Lundgren and Melissa Smith
Command Performance (radio series), a US Armed Forces Radio show from 1942 to 1949

See also
Royal Command Performance, a theatrical or musical performance requested by the monarch of the UK